Fadashi is an erstwhile dialect of Berta that is distinct enough to be considered a separate language.

References

Berta languages
Languages of Ethiopia